Tutang (also Romanized as Tūtang; also known as Homā-ye Bālā) is a village in Siyahu Rural District, Fin District, Bandar Abbas County, Hormozgan Province, Iran. At the 2006 census, its population was 233, in 68 families.

References 

Populated places in Bandar Abbas County